Homoranthus bebo is a flowering  plant in the  family Myrtaceae and is endemic to a small area in northern New South Wales. It is a low-lying shrub with leaves that are usually flat and with groups of up to ten yellow flowers. It is only known from the Dthinna Dthinnawan Nature Reserve near Yetman.

Description
Flowering occurs mostly from September to November.

Taxonomy and naming
Homoranthus bebo was first formally described in 2011 by Lachlan Copeland, Lyndley Craven and Jeremy Bruhl from a specimen collected in the Bebo State forest (now the Dthinna Dthinnawan Nature Reserve) in 2001 and the description was published in Australian Systematic Botany. The specific epithet (bebo) refers to the name of the state forest where the type specimen was collected.

Distribution and habitat
Currently known from a single population in Dthinna Dthinnawan Nature Reserve (formerly Bebo State Forest)~20km north-north east of Yetman New South Wales. This species grows in deep sandy soils over sandstone.

Conservation
Homoranthus bebo is classified as "critically endangered" under the Australian Government EPBC Act of 1999.
It is known from a single population of at least 300 individuals.

References

External links
 The Australasian Virtual Herbarium – Occurrence data for Homoranthus bebo

bebo
Flora of New South Wales
Myrtales of Australia
Plants described in 2011